Miodrag Krivokapić (born 6 September 1959) is a Montenegrin former footballer who played in defence. He played for Red Star Belgrade and represented Yugoslavia before moving to Scotland in 1988, where he went on to play for a number of clubs, including Dundee United and Motherwell.

Playing career

Club
Krivokapić joined Dundee United in 1989 for £200,000 from Red Star, where he had previously won four international caps. He stayed with United until 1993, picking up a Scottish Cup runners-up medal in 1991, before spending three years at Motherwell. Krivokapic had spells with Raith Rovers and Hamilton Academical before retiring.

International
He made his debut for Yugoslavia in a December 1987 European Championship qualification match away against Turkey and has earned a total of 5 caps, scoring no goals. His final international was a September 1988 friendly match against Spain.

Managerial career
He was also reserve team coach at Hamilton winning the Scottish Reserve League in 1997–98. He had a four-game spell as caretaker manager of Motherwell alongside John Philliben in 2001 but was released from the coaching staff when new manager Eric Black was appointed.

In June 2008, Krivokapić returned to Scotland when he was appointed by Celtic to work on youth development.

Personal life
Krivokapić has two sons, Balša and Matija. Balsa played for East Stirlingshire and Matija played for Scottish junior outfit Newmains United.

Honours

Red Star
Yugoslav First League: 1983–84, 1987–88
Yugoslav Cup: 1985

References

External links
 
 
 
 Miodrag Krivokapić postao trener Seltika, Blic, June 20, 2008
 

1959 births
Living people
Footballers from Nikšić
Association football defenders
Yugoslav footballers
Yugoslavia international footballers
Serbia and Montenegro footballers
FK Sutjeska Nikšić players
Red Star Belgrade footballers
Dundee United F.C. players
Motherwell F.C. players
Raith Rovers F.C. players
Hamilton Academical F.C. players
Yugoslav Second League players
Yugoslav First League players
Scottish Football League players
Scottish Football League representative players
Yugoslav expatriate footballers
Expatriate footballers in Scotland
Yugoslav expatriate sportspeople in Scotland
Serbia and Montenegro expatriate footballers
Serbia and Montenegro expatriate sportspeople in Scotland
Serbia and Montenegro football managers
Motherwell F.C. non-playing staff
Serbia and Montenegro expatriate football managers
Red Star Belgrade non-playing staff
Montenegrin expatriate sportspeople in Scotland